= Bir Ben Ayed =

Coordinates: 34°54′39″N 10°35′34″E

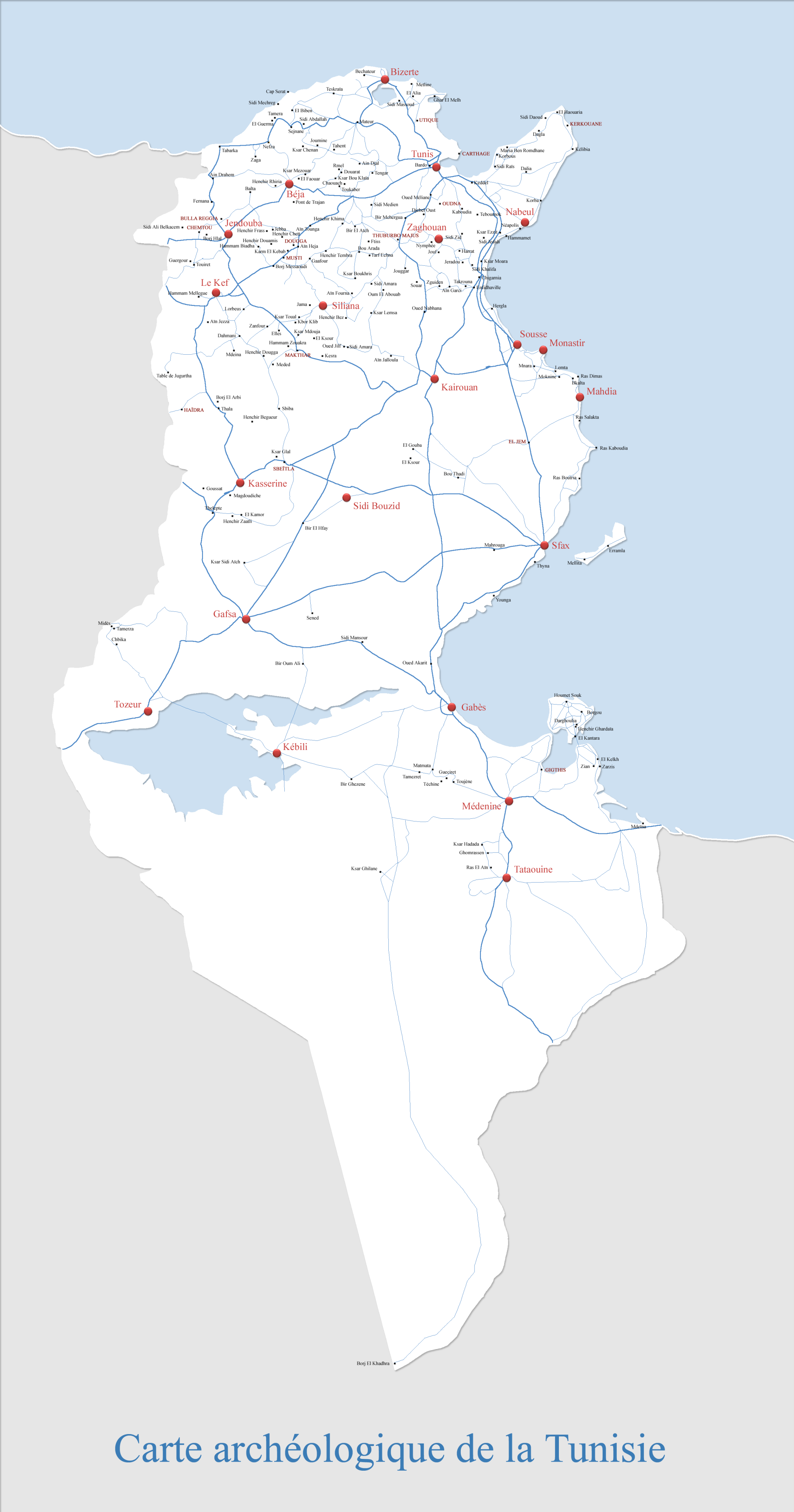
Archaeology map of Tunisia

Bir Ben Ayed is a former Roman and Byzantine town of Africa, 29.4 kilometres (18.3 mi) north west of Sfax, Tunisia, near the modern town of Sidi Litayem. The town is located on a wadi, although it was known in antiquity as a well town.

The region has a hot semi-arid climate (Köppen BSh). Summers, like all of North Africa, are hot and almost rainless, whilst winters are very pleasant with only light rain usual. The area is today known for its olive production.
